Tân Trụ is a rural district of Long An province in the Mekong Delta region of Vietnam. As of 2003 the district had a population of 62,633. The district covers an area of 175 km². The district capital lies at Tân Trụ.

Divisions
Nhựt Ninh
Đức Tân
Tân Phước Tây
Bình Tịnh
Bình Trinh Đông
Bình Lãng
Lạc Tấn
Quê Mỹ Thạnh
Mỹ Bình
An Nhựt Tân

References

Districts of Long An province